Serixia ranauensis is a species of beetle in the family Cerambycidae. It was described by Masao Hayashi in 1975. It is known from Borneo.

References

Serixia
Beetles described in 1975